Paul Skinner is a British philatelist and head curator of the Philatelic Collections at the British Library.

About
Skinner began his philatelic career in the commercial sector, working for international philatelic auctioneers. He joined the British Library in 2004, and succeeded David Beech as the head curator of the Philatelic Collections. His particular area of interest is in the technology used for security printing and stamp production. He has worked on several exhibitions, including "The British Library Philatelic Rarities" (2010), and "Good Graving is the best security" (2014). His publications include studies on the philatelic bounty of the Pitcairn Islands, and stamps of Northern Rhodesia. He is a member of the Royal Philatelic Society London.

See also
 British Library Philatelic Collections
 List of philatelists
 Royal Philatelic Society London

References

External links
 British Library staff page
 Art Matters podcast: the art of stamp design, podcast with Paul Skinner and Antonio Acala, 2019

Living people
British philatelists
Employees of the British Library
British curators
Fellows of the Royal Philatelic Society London
Year of birth missing (living people)